Danny Brocklehurst (born June 1971 in Hyde, Cheshire) is an English screenwriter and playwright. He has won both BAFTA and Royal Television Society writing awards. He was featured in the writers' section of the Broadcast magazine Hot 100 2007.
His Sky comedy Brassic has the highest audience appreciation score of any UK comedy.

In 2013 he also wrote the track "Ring" with dance band Mint Royale, featuring the vocals of Willem Dafoe.

Early career
Brocklehurst worked as a journalist for several years (as a freelancer for The Guardian, City Life and Manchester Evening News and senior feature writer for The Big Issue) before becoming a full-time screenwriter. He cited Tony Marchant, Jimmy McGovern and Alan Bleasdale as his writing inspirations. In a Creative Times feature in 2010, he wrote that Our Friends in the North was his favourite drama of all time.

Writing

Television work
Brocklehurst wrote several episodes of the BAFTA award-winning series Clocking Off, as well as the two-part BBC film The Stretford Wives, which was shot by director Peter Webber. With Shameless, Brocklehurst won a BAFTA for series one, co-wrote series two with Paul Abbott and became lead writer on series three. He left prior to the fourth series.

His series Sorted, a BBC postal drama starring Hugo Speer, aired in 2006. In 2007, Brocklehurst wrote a film about the Fathers4Justice campaign for producers Harbour Pictures. Whilst, his Company Pictures produced four-part ITV drama, Talk To Me, starring Max Beesley, Laura Fraser, Adrian Bower, Kate Ashfield and Emma Pierson.

He has written episodes of both Jimmy McGovern's The Street and his new crime drama Accused for BBC One. In 2011 he wrote a three-part BBC drama, Exile, starring John Simm and Jim Broadbent. It received an average of 5.5 million viewers and an Audience Appreciation score of 90%.

In 2011 it was announced that Brocklehurst would write a new HBO drama, Dirty, with Andrea Arnold attached to direct. This project is now being developed with Sharon Horgan and Amazon. In August 2013, BBC1 announced a new drama, Ordinary Lies, written by Brocklehurst.

The Driver, starring David Morrissey was announced in January 2014, a three-part drama about a taxi driver who takes a job driving for a criminal. Shown on BBC One it co-starred Ian Hart, Claudie Blakely, and Colm Meaney. It was co-created by Jim Poyser and made by Red Productions and Highfield Pictures.  In January 2015, US network Showtime announced they were developing a remake of the drama.

HBO announced a project called A Teacher, in February 2014 which would be co-written by Brocklehurst and Hannah Fidell, and executive produced by Mark Duplass. The show, a drama about a teacher/student relationship, based on the film of the same name, didn't get made by HBO; it has been picked up by FX. In 2017 Netflix made Safe starring Michael C. Hall, written by Brocklehurst and Harlan Coben.

Come Home, a three-part BBC drama, aired in April 2018, starring Christopher Eccleston and Paula Malcomson. The Stranger, also co-written with Coben, debuted on Netflix in January 2020, starring Richard Armitage, Stephen Rea and Jennifer Saunders. The first series of Brassic premiered on Sky in 2019 and has been renewed for two additional series. It is Sky's most successful comedy since 2012.

His Netflix series Stay Close was the highest rated UK series of 2022.

In May 2022, the BBC and STAN commissioned a new series created by Brocklehurst,Ten Pound Poms, a drama about the British citizens who migrated to Australia after the Second World War, with filming commencing in Australia shortly after.

Film
In film, he adapted the Whitbread nominee Buddha Da (as Jimmy Buddha); and wrote The Railway Children Return for Studio Canal, a sequel to the 1970 film, The Railway Children, itself based on the E. Nesbit novel.

Theatre
Brocklehurst has written three award-winning plays, My Eight Times Table, Nobody and Loaded (transferred to Radio Four), as well being story adviser and book co-writer of the West End (and national touring) musical Never Forget. His play Casual Ties was a Royal Exchange hit in 2014. It is a dissection of modern relationships.

Radio
Brocklehurst has written extensively for radio. His police series Stone is in its ninth series. It stars Hugo Speer as Detective Inspector John Stone and every episode features a morally complex crime.  It has been described as "gritty" (The Guardian), "hard hitting" (The Times) and "realistic in a way radio drama rarely is" (The Observer).

He wrote a play about Thatcher's Mutually Assured Destruction policy in the 1980s, The End of The World, a thriller about a man who seems to have ceased to exist Nobody, an Australian set examination of greed, Loaded and a single drama about an eighty-year-old woman who admits to a series of brutal murders, Mary Shane.

He has appeared as a regular commentator on Radio 4 and 5Live.

Brocklehurst wrote the podcast Ecstasy: The Battle OF Rave that features David Morrissey, Monica Dolan, Ian Hart Meera Syal and Are Edmondson. It is half drama, half documentary.

Filmography
 Clocking Off, series 2–4 (BAFTA nomination), episodes starring Sophie Okonedo, Ricky Tomlinson and Pam Ferris.
 Linda Green, episodes starring Liza Tarbuck and Jane Horrocks.
 The Stretford Wives (directed by Peter Webber), starring Fay Ripley.
 Shameless, series 1–3 (BAFTA winner), starring James McAvoy and Anne-Marie Duff.
 Sorted (directed by Iain B Macdonald), starring Hugo Speer.
 Talk to Me (directed by Emmy winner Dearbhla Walsh), starring Max Beesley and Aaron Johnson.
 The Street (one episode, with Jimmy McGovern)
 Shameless USA (Showtime – John Wells), Episodes starring William H Macy and Joan Cusack
 Life After Marriage (ABC network, with Grey's Anatomy creator Shonda Rhimes)
 Accused – director Richard Laxton, starring Andy Serkis and Jodie Whittaker International Emmy Winner.
 Exile – (BAFTA nomination) director John Alexander, starring John Simm and Jim Broadbent and Timothy West.
 Accused 2 – (BAFTA nomination, best Mini-series, International Emmy nomination Best Drama Series) director David Blair, starring Robert Sheehan, Sheridan Smith and John Bishop.
The Driver – starring David Morrissey, Ian Hart, and Colm Meaney. RTS best drama nomination.
Ordinary Lies starring Mackenzie Crook, Max Beesley, Michelle Keegan, Sally Lindsay and Jo Joyner.
Ordinary Lies starring Angela Griffin, Matt Di Angelo, Rebekah Staton and Con O'Neill.
The Five Sky 1/Netflix drama featuring Lee Ingelby and Sarah Solomani
In the Dark BBC1 drama starring MyAnna Buring. 
Safe Netflix drama starring Michael C. Hall.
Come Home starring Christopher Eccleston. Winner of RTS best writer and best drama awards.
Brassic Sky one comedy drama starring Joe Gilgun and Michelle Keegan. 
BAFTA nominated 2020
The Stranger Netflix thriller starring Richard Armitage and Jennifer Saunders.
A Teacher FX limited series.  Co-creator and executive producer.
Stay Close Netflix original. LEAD WRITER.
No Return ITV series with Sheridan Smith. Mini series.
Ten Pound Poms Upcoming six-part drama series. Creator.

Awards

BAFTA
BAFTA TV Award

In 2011 he was nominated for three Writers Guild Awards for Exile and Accused and Brassic, for which he won.

Royal Television Society
RTS Television Award

References

External links
 

1971 births
Living people
People from Hyde, Greater Manchester
21st-century British screenwriters
British male television writers
BAFTA winners (people)
English television writers
English screenwriters
English male screenwriters
English male dramatists and playwrights